Sean, Shaun or Shawn Farrell may refer to:
Sean Farrell (American football) (born 1960), American football player
Sean Farrell (ice hockey) (born 2001), American ice hockey player
Sean Farrell (footballer) (born 1969), former association football player
Sean Farrell (rugby union), Australian rugby union player
Seán Farrell (died 1972), Irish Sinn Féin politician, represented Leitrim-Sligo from 1923–27
Seán Farrell (hurler) (born 1954), Irish hurler
Shaun Farrell (born 1975), New Zealand runner
Shawn Farrell, fictional character in The 4400